Melodi Grand Prix 2007 (shortened MGP 2007) was the television show in which the Norwegian entry for the Eurovision Song Contest 2007 was chosen.

Just like in 2006, there were three semifinals held before the final, where televoting decided the top four songs, the top two of which went to the final (in random order), and the songs who were placed 3rd and 4th went to the 'Second Chance' semifinal (also in random order). If NRK follow their traditional ways, it is unlikely we will ever find out the full results of the semifinals.

On 12 October 2006, NRK announced that it had received 464 songs for the 2007 Melodi Grand Prix, over half of which came from Sweden. However, in the final selection of the 18 participating entries, only five were written partially or entirely by Swedish composers, less than half the number of the 13 Swedish entries in Melodi Grand Prix 2006. This was most probably the results of the heavy criticism NRK received from Norwegian composers due to the heavy Swedish dominance in MGP 2006.

Just like in MGP 2006, Synnøve Svabø and Stian Barsnes Simonsen hosted all five shows. However, 2006's additional side commentator, Jostein Pedersen, was swapped with trend guru and television host Per Sundnes, though Sundnes played a slightly smaller role than his predecessor, primarily being in charge of interval reports from the different host cities. However, he will substitute Jostein Pedersen as the new Norwegian Eurovision commentator for NRK in Helsinki.

Schedule

Final

Voting

Spokespersons

Alta: Marit Hætta Øverli
Bodø: Jonas Ueland Kolstad
Stokke: Tove Lisbeth Vasvik
Eastern Norway: Jorun Vang
Southern Norway: Knut Knudsen Eigenland
Northern Norway: Nina Birgitte Einem
Central Norway: Tom Erik Sørensen
Western Norway: Øyver Bakke

Semi-finals

Semi-final 1

Semi-final 2

Semi-final 3

Siste Sjansen round

Past Grand Prix experience
Trine Rein took part in the Melodi Grand Prix 2006 final, where also the two songwriters of "Are You Ready", Moen and Hagen, participated as artists. Unlike Trine, they reached the super final where they became the runners up behind Christine Guldbrandsen. Also present in the qualifying rounds the same year were Christina Undhjem and Jannicke Abrahamsen. Jannicke also reached the second chance round, where she failed to qualify for the final.
Both Andreea and Marianne Solberg, the latter one as part of the five member group Blissed, took part in Melodi Grand Prix 2005, where both failed to reach the super final.
Malin Schavenius finished joint last in Melodi Grand Prix 2004, without any points at all.
Trond "Teeny" Holter, composer of Crash!'s "Wannabe", competed two years in a row as a guitarist in the glam rock band Wig Wam. In 2004, their "Crazy Things" finished third in that year's super final. In MGP 2005 they won the national final with a margin of more than 10,000 televotes. Their song "In My Dreams" finished on ninth place in the Eurovision Song Contest 2005 final after previously having qualified through the semi final the same week.
Jan Eggum, the composer of "Creator", took part as an artist in Melodi Grand Prix 1988 with the song "Deilige drøm" (Lovely Dream), where he finished tenth and last. Early rumours said that Mia Gundersen, a three time Melodi Grand Prix participant, would sing his song.
Thomas G:son has written or co-written more than 30 national final entries for six different countries; Sweden, Norway, Finland, Spain, Latvia and Romania. Two of them, "Listen To Your Heartbeat" by Friends and "Invincible" by Carola, won the Swedish Melodifestivalen in respectively 2001 and 2006, and both went on to finish fifth in the Eurovision Song Contest 2001 and 2006. His most successful MGP entry so far was the drag duo Queentastic's "Absolutely Fabulous", which finished third in MGP 2006.
Kirsti Carr, composer of "Livets små stjerner", took part in Melodi Grand Prix 2006 as an artist of the song "Misled", which reached the second chance round, but failed to gain enough televotes to reach the final from there.

This Year's Melodi Grand Prix
A total of 260,249 televotes were counted in the gold final, down with about 4,450 from the MGP gold final of 2006.
After a rather unexciting vote announcement sequence, as Guri won with more than 30,000 televotes more than the runner up Jannicke, the 45-year-old famous musical artist and Dancing with the Stars participant Guri Schanke, was declared the winner of Melodi Grand Prix 2007. Though the punk-pop/rock group Crash! won the votes of the three juries by a landslide – composed as they all were by three younger and three older than 30 years – they were the least favourites among the televoters. Guri Schanke won four out of the five televoting regions, only missing out on the South of Norway by a couple of thousand votes. Guri received about 38% of the televotes in the gold final, a much higher percentage and total number of votes than Christine Guldbrandsen received the year before.
Ven a bailar conmigo, as is the title of Guri's winning entry, is Spanish and means come with me to dance or simply come dance with me. The entry was specifically order by the Norwegian broadcaster NRK who wanted Guri Schanke to dance and sing an uptempo, fiery Latino song – due to Guri's second place in the Norwegian version of the popular TV series Dancing with the Stars – airing on the commercial TV station TV2 – where she learned to dance tango perfectly, amongst other dances. Even the songwriter Thomas G:son – Sweden's answer to Ralph Siegel concerning the record of Eurovision Song Contest and national final compositions – was personally contacted and invited by NRK. The leading Eurovision fan site, ESCToday.com, has already crowned Thomas G:son to be the new Eurovision king stealing the privilege from Ireland's triple winner Johnny Logan. Both Guri and Thomas thought NRK had a fantastic idea and decided to jump into it. Since then, NRK has promoted Guri and her song as the one to beat, even being announced a week before the other entrants in her semi final and giving her the last, and thus best, starting position in the big final.
NRK video of Guri Schanke's winning performance of her latino entry Ven a bailar conmigo.
Before the results of the gold final were announced, last year's winner Christine Guldbrandsen made a spectacular entrance into the stage of Oslo Spektrum, where she was descending from the sky looking like a real angel. She sang two of her own songs, one from her new album that was released commercially five days prior to the final, plus a remixed version of her own Eurovision entry Alvedansen.
The after party for participants, hosts, previous MGP and Eurovision artists and other invited guests, was this year held at the new, and Norway's only, Hard Rock Café situated on Oslo's main street, the Karl Johan Street, the location of Norway's royal castle and parliament, plus Oslo's central train station and parts of its university. There, all the super finalists performed their songs once again, as well as Bobbysocks who sang their Eurovision winning entry La det swinge. Guri Schanke promised not to put her heals onto the roof as she said, but rather enjoy her victory in a more relaxed manner with just a glass of champagne or two.

See also
Eurovision Song Contest 2007

ESC history
Norway in the Eurovision Song Contest 2007
Norway in the Eurovision Song Contest

MGP history
Melodi Grand Prix

References

External links
Official website
NRK: Melodi Grand Prix 2007

Artists' websites
Trine Rein
Andreas Ljones
Guri Schanke
Crash!
Marika Lejon
Jenny Jensen
Malin Schavenius
Hazen
Christina Undhjem (MySpace)
Dusty Cowshit

2007
2007 song contests
2007 Norwegian television seasons